Veghel is a town and a former municipality in the southern Netherlands. On 1 January 2017 Veghel, together with Schijndel and Sint-Oedenrode, merged into a new municipality called Meierijstad creating the largest municipality of the province North-Brabant in terms of land area.

History 
The first settlements date back to Roman times and were established near the River Aa. The oldest written record of Veghel dates from 1225. It is a document of the Abbey of Berne, written in Latin on a piece of parchment, and describes several properties owned by the abbey. Among those is an estate located in the settlement of "Vehchele".

In 1310, John II of Brabant granted the inhabitants the right to use common grounds. For some decades in the 16th and 17th century the municipality was ruled by the Lords Van Erp, residing at their castle of Frisselsteijn in Veghel.

In 1648 Veghel became part of the Republic of the Seven United Netherlands. As a former part of the Duchy of Brabant, Veghel is situated in the Meierij of 's-Hertogenbosch. As a Catholic town, Veghel (like all the other areas of Brabant and Limburg which were transferred to the Netherlands by the Peace of Westphalia) suffered economic and religious oppression from the Protestant Dutch and was part of the military buffer zone of the Dutch Republic.

In 1719 Veghel became a market town, when it was granted market rights by the States General of the Netherlands, receiving the privilege of holding weekly markets and four annual fairs. However, it was not until the French wars of 1795 that Veghel formally received freedom of religion again and received a guarantee of full common rights from the Dutch government. In 1810 Veghel became part of the Kingdom of the Netherlands. From the middle of the 19th century the agrarian market town began developing into an industrial town as a consequence of the opening of the South Willem's Canal. The construction of large-scale buildings like the neogothic church by Pierre Cuypers and the neoclassical town hall dates from that period. Monastic orders made Veghel a regional centre of health care and education, which it remains to this day.

In 1940 Veghel was occupied by German troops. With the beginning of Operation Market Garden in 1944 Veghel was one of the dropping-places for Allied paratroops owing to its strategic location.

The period since the 1950s has seen much growth, with the development of new industries and the establishment in Veghel of several international companies (e.g. Mars, Incorporated, FrieslandCampina, DMV International, Agrifirm, Kuehne + Nagel, DHL Supply Chain, Alliance Healthcare, ThyssenKrupp and Vanderlande Industries). Its shopping centre and marketplace earned the town the name of "Pearl of the Meierij". Veghel is an educational centre for the surrounding district with several secondary schools, a senior secondary vocational school, and one of the oldest higher vocational schools in the area: the Pedagogic Academy, which was founded in 1872.

Since 1994, Veghel and the neighbouring town of Erp have formed a single municipality.

Demographics

Towns 
Population figures as of 1 January 2015, ranked by size:

Population centres 
Population figures as of 1 January 2015, ranked by size:

Language
The language spoken by the native population is North Meierijs (an East Brabantian dialect, which is very similar to colloquial Dutch).

Nationalities
Compared to other towns in the region, the ethnic makeup of Veghel is relatively diverse. More than 22% of the town's population, or 17% of the municipality's population, is of foreign origin. In total, Veghel is home to people of more than a hundred different nationalities. About 90% of the municipality's total foreign population lives inside the town proper of Veghel.

Local festivals 
Every November sees the celebration of the entry of St Nicholas (Sinterklaas).
Every two years in June or July, the Slokdarmfestival takes place.
On 1 September the harbour festival takes place.
In February or March the traditional carnival is held.

Attractions 
The neogothic church of St Lambert and its graveyard containing war graves
The neorenaissance former town hall
The neogothic former synagogue (recently rebuilt)
The Protestant church
The monastery of the Franciscan Sisters of the Immaculate Conception from the Holy Mother of God with its gardens and church

Notable residents

 Anky van Grunsven, dressage champion.
 Dillianne van den Boogaard, former Netherlands international field hockey player.
 Earnie Stewart, former United States international soccer player.
 Theo Lucius, former professional footballer for PSV Eindhoven and Feyenoord.
 Theo Maassen, comedian and actor.
 Glenn van Berlo, racing driver.

Twin towns - sister cities
Veghel is twinned with:
 Goch in Germany
 Pont-Audemer in France

Gallery

References

External links

Official website

Meierijstad
Former municipalities of North Brabant
Populated places in North Brabant
Municipalities of the Netherlands disestablished in 2017
Port cities and towns in the Netherlands